Otis Mason Martin (March 1, 1918 – November 21, 1955) was an American stock car racing driver. One of the pioneers of the NASCAR Grand National Series, he competed in 23 races over the first six years of the sport, with a best finish of sixth; he finished fifth in a non-sanctioned event in October 1949.

Martin, a native of Bassett, Virginia was known as a mountain man and raced wearing bib overalls. He died in a car accident on Virginia State Route 57 on November 21, 1955.

References
Citations

Bibliography

External links

1918 births
1955 deaths
People from Bassett, Virginia
Racing drivers from Virginia
NASCAR drivers